Bulgaria inquinans is a fungus in the family Phacidiaceae. It is commonly known by the name black bulgar and black jelly drops.

It grows on branches and bark of dead oak and hornbeam. It has also been growing on ash trees due to ash dieback disease. The species can be found from October to March. It can be commonly found on felled trees stored in timber yards. Research into the colouring materials found in the fungus by H.Lockett and R.Edwards at Bradford University gave name to three purple pigments as two bulgarhodins and bulgarein.

Description
The cap of Bulgaria inquinans generally has a diameter between 0.5 and 4 cm (0.19 in to  1.6 in). It has a flat top when young but later become more cupped. These mushrooms generally grow in medium sized clusters on dead trees, generally oak and hornbeam, but also ash trees. The texture of the mushroom is similar to leather or elastic, depending on dry weather (elastic like), or wet weather (leather). It grows across mainland Europe and in the British Isles. It also grows in parts of the United States.

The species is inedible.

Similar species include Ascocoryne sarcoides and Exidia glandulosa.

Gallery

References

External links
 SoortenBank.nl 

Leotiomycetes
Fungi described in 1794
Fungi of Europe
Fungi of North America
Inedible fungi
Taxa named by Christiaan Hendrik Persoon